The sooty-capped babbler (Malacopteron affine) is a member of the family Pellorneidae. It occurs in Malaysia, Indonesia, Brunei, Thailand, and Singapore.

The sooty-capped babbler is also known in Malay as rimba tinjau belukar.  Its main diet is small insects.

It is threatened by habitat loss.

There are two subspecies:

 M. a. affine (Blyth, 1842) – Malay Peninsula, Sumatra, Banyak Islands, Bangka Islands
 M. a. phoeniceum Deignan, 1950 – Borneo

References

sooty-capped babbler
Birds of Malesia
sooty-capped babbler
sooty-capped babbler